This is a list of capital cities that were specially designed, planned, and built to be a national or regional capital.

Built

Currently proposed or under construction

Former proposals and attempts 

 Welthauptstadt Germania was the proposed renewal of Berlin, (Nazi Germany) as a planned "world capital", although only a small portion was built between 1937 and 1943. Many of the plans were designed by Albert Speer. Progress was halted by the failure of Operation Barbarossa during World War II.
 Al-Karamah was intended to be the permanent capital of the United Arab Emirates located between Abu Dhabi and Dubai, but it was never built.
Viedma, was proposed by President Raúl Alfonsín as a new Capital for Argentina in 1986, replacing Buenos Aires. The idea was to change the centralization in the port of Buenos Aires, and promote development in Patagonia. The economic collapse of Alfonsín government halted the project that had been approved by Law.

Notes

References

Purpose-built

Moving and relocation